The Nanchang J-12 (Chinese: 歼-12) was a lightweight supersonic fighter built by the People's Republic of China, intended for use by the People's Liberation Army Air Force (PLAAF). It was one of the first serious attempts by Chinese aircraft manufacturers to develop an indigenous, modern jet fighter. Weighing  empty, the J-12 is one of the lightest jet fighters ever built. However, neither the J-12 nor the related Shenyang J-13 project entered service.

Design and development
In 1969, the PLAAF issued an order to build a small, inexpensive, STOL (short takeoff and landing) lightweight fighter in order to replace the MiG-19. Two designs were submitted, namely the Shenyang J-11 and the Nanchang J-12. Prototypes of the J-12 were designed by Lu Xiaopeng and built by the Nanchang Aircraft Manufacturing Company (NAMC). The J-12 was a small single-seat jet fighter with low-set, swept wings, swept control surfaces, tubular fuselage, and nose intake with small or absent shock cone and flight testing began on 26 December 1970. Due to less than satisfactory performance, three additional J-12I prototypes were built with improvements such as simplified control surfaces, a lighter area ruled fuselage, and revised intake. 

In 1977 the development of J-12 was abandoned, due to inadequate firepower and engine thrust and also likely due to the introduction of the Chengdu J-7, that offered superior performance and was based on the Soviet MiG-21F.

The J-12 prototypes had accumulated 61 hours in 135 flights by 1977. In 1990s, Lu Xiaopeng proposed upgrading the J-12's fighter design with a reduced Radar cross-section to make the J-12 stealthy, and suggested a modified J-12 fighter to a carrier based fighter for PLA Navy, but none of the proposals were accepted.

Variants
J-12The initial version of the light fighter with pitot bi-furcated air intake and non-afterburning engine
J-12I (aka J-12A) Improved J-12 powered by a  Wopen WP-6Z afterburning turbojet

Specifications (J-12)

References

External links

 Airwar.ru (page in Russian)
 Uncommon Aircraft
 Images of preserved J-12s at Airliners.net
 J-12 and J-XX at Globalsecurity.org
 China-Defense.com
 J12 fighter photos and introduction (Chinese)

J-12, Nanchang
J-12
Cancelled military aircraft projects of China